The fourth series of the BBC family sitcom My Family originally aired between 21 March 2003 and 25 December 2003. The series was commissioned following consistently high ratings from the third series. The opening episode of the series, "Fitting Punishment", re-introduces five of the main characters, with the exception of Janey, played by Daniela Denby-Ashe. The episode also introduces a further main character into the fold – Roger Bailey, played by Keiron Self. All fourteen episodes in the fourth series are thirty minutes in length, including the Christmas special. The series was once again produced by Rude Boy Productions, a company that produces comedies created by Fred Barron. The series was filmed at Pinewood Studios in London, in front of a live audience.

Episode Information

Reception

Viewers
The series was once again given a prime-time Friday evening slot, with most episodes airing at 8:30pm. The first episode of the series gained 8.77 million viewers, a rise of over 1 million viewers from the previous series. The episode was rated the second highest rating for the week. Following heavy promotion, the episode "The Great Escape" managed to break the 10 million barrier, becoming the most watched episode of the series. The fourth series averaged 8.30 million viewers for each episode.

References

External links
My Family: Series Four at the British Comedy Guide
My Family: Series Four at My Family Online
BBC Comedy- My Family Series 4

2003 British television seasons